Oh My Messy Mind is an extended play by British singer-songwriter James Bay. The EP was released on 10 May 2019.

In a press release, Bay said "I wanted to be honest about some of my own stories and other stories I was being pulled into. I regularly write things down in a stream of consciousness to empty my head. Oh My Messy Mind is a line I wrote on a particularly dark day a little while ago. It seemed to reflect a weight that I felt I was carrying at the time, and that comes back now and again. The songwriting that followed was me looking for a release."

Bay promoted the EP with appearances on The Artist’s Den, The Late Show with Stephen Colbert, and Today.

Critical reception
Mitch Mosk from Atwood Magazine called the EP "breathtaking" saying, "Though it's a bite-sized four tracks in length, the EP packs a serious punch in its assertion of James Bay's inimitable artistry."

Track listing

Charts

References

2019 EPs
James Bay (singer) albums